David Campos (poet) is an American poet, writer, and producer of video poetry from California. His debut collection, Furious Dusk, won the 2014 Andrés Montoya Poetry Prize from Letras Latinas, the literary initiative at the University of Notre Dame's Institute for Latino Studies (ILS).

Campos is a CantoMundo fellow. His poems have appeared in American Poetry Review, Boxcar Poetry Review, Huizache, Atticus Review, and Verdad, among others.

Career 
Campos attended Fresno City College, and California State University, Fresno where he earned a BA in English Education and the University of California, Riverside for an MFA in Creative Writing and Writing for the Performing Arts.

He lives in Fresno, where he teaches English at Fresno City College and College of the Sequoias.

Publications 
Furious Dusk, University of Notre Dame Press, 2015. .

External links 
 Video Poems at Moving Poems
 David Campos at Vimeo
 Review of Furious Dusk at Harvard Review

References 

Living people
21st-century American poets
Year of birth missing (living people)